The 2011 Tulane Green Wave football team represented Tulane University in the 2011 NCAA Division I FBS football season. The Green Wave played their home games at the Louisiana Superdome, which was renamed the Mercedes-Benz Superdome on October 23. They competed in the West Division of Conference USA. The team was coached by interim head coach Mark Hutson following fifth-year head coach Bob Toledo's resignation on October 18 after starting the season 2–5. The team finished the season 2–11, 1–7 in C-USA - last place in the West Division.

Schedule

References

Tulane
Tulane Green Wave football seasons
Tulane Green Wave football